The Ministry of Finance is a central executive body of the Government of Kazakhstan, providing leadership and intersectoral coordination in the financial sector. 
It was established on 17 December 1991, just a day after Kazakhstan declared its independence from the Soviet Union, a law "On budget system of the Republic of Kazakhstan" was introduced. The Ministry is currently led by Erulan Jamaubaev.

Ministers
Tuleubek Abdikadirov, April 1990 — November 1992
Erkeshbay Derbisov, 1992 — 1994
Alexander Pavlov, October 1994 — February 1998
Sauat Mynbayev, 1998 — 1999
Oraz Jandosov, January 1999 — October 1999
Mazhit Esenbayev, 1999 — January 2002
Alexander Pavlov, January 2002 — June 2003
Erbolat Dosaev, 2003 — April 2004
Arman Dunayev, April 2004 — January 2006
Natalya Korzhova, January 2006 — November 2007
Bolat Zhamishev, November 2007 — November 2013
Bakhyt Sultanov, November 2013 — September 2018
Älihan Smaiylov, September 2018 — May 2020
Yerulan Zhamaubaev, May 2020 —

Tasks 

 budget execution;
budget accounting and reporting on budget execution;
accounting and reporting on the National Fund of the Republic of Kazakhstan;
ensuring the receipt of taxes and other mandatory payments to the budget;
fullness and timeliness of transfer of mandatory pension contributions and social deductions to the State Security Fund;
state regulation of production and turnover of ethyl alcohol and alcoholic products;
state regulation of production and turnover of tobacco products;
state regulation of production and turnover of individual types of petroleum products;
state regulation in the field of customs;
state and guaranteed borrowing by the state;
budget lending;
management of republican state property;
management of government and guaranteed by the state debt and debt to the state;
regulation of public procurement;
implementation of internal financial control;
implementation of control over bankruptcy procedures (with the exception of banks, insurance (reinsurance) organizations and accumulative pension funds);
regulation of activities in the field of accounting and financial statements;
regulation in the field of audit activity and control over the activities of audit and professional organizations, conducting state monitoring of property;
financial monitoring for countering.

Structure

Departments 
For 2019:

 Department of Reporting and Statistics of Public Finance;
Department of Budget Planning;
Department of State Budget;
Department of Budget of Law Enforcement, Special Organs and Defense;
Department of Budget of Social Sphere;
Department of Budget of Industry, Transport and Communications;
Department of Budget of the Agro-Industrial Complex, Natural Resources, Construction and Housing and Communal Services;
Department of Budget Legislation;
Department of Tax and Customs Law;
Department of Appeals;
Department of State Procurement Legislation;
Department of Accounting and Auditing Methodology;
Department of International Financial Relations;
Department of State Borrowing;
Department of Budget Lending, National Fund of the Republic of Kazakhstan and the Interaction on Financial Sector;
Department of Legal Service;
Department of Digitalization and Public Services;

See also
Economy of Kazakhstan

References 

Finance
Kazakhstan
Economy of Kazakhstan
Ministries established in 1991
1991 establishments in Kazakhstan